The Chicago Force was a women's American football team. Founded in 2003 by Lisa Cole, the team played at De La Salle HS & St. Rita HS – both on Chicago's South side; Lane Stadium at Lane Technical College Prep High School, Holmgren Athletic Complex at North Park University on Chicago's North Side, and at Jorndt Field, commonly known as Winnemac Stadium. The team played the 2012–2014 seasons at Lazier Field on the campus of Evanston Township High School, and for the 2015 season onward, back at Lane Tech.

From their inaugural season until 2010, the Chicago Force was part of the Independent Women's Football League.  Following that, the team moved to the Women's Football Alliance.  The Chicago Force ceased operations after the 2017 season.

Season-By-Season 

|-
| colspan="6" align="center" | Chicago Force (IWFL)
|-
|2003 || 9 || 0 || 0 || 1st Western Southwest || Won Western Conference Semifinal (Corvallis)Lost Western Conference Championship (Sacramento)
|-
|2004 || 6 || 2 || 0 || 2nd Eastern Mid-Atlantic || Lost Eastern Conference Semifinal (New York)
|-
|2005 || 8 || 2 || 0 || 1st Western Midwest || Lost Western Conference Semifinal (Tacoma)
|-
|2006 || 6 || 2 || 0 || 2nd Western Midwest || Lost Western Conference Semifinal (Detroit)
|-
|2007 || 5 || 3 || 0 || 2nd Western Midwest || –
|-
|2008 || 8 || 0 || 0 || 1st Eastern Midwest || Won Eastern Conference Semifinal (Detroit)Won Eastern Conference Championship (Pittsburgh)Lost IWFL Championship (Dallas)
|-
|2009 || 6 || 2 || 0 || 2nd Western Midwest || Won Western Conference Semifinal (Seattle)Lost Western Conference Championship (Kansas City)
|-
|2010 || 7 || 1 || 0 || 2nd Western Midwest || Lost Western Conference Semifinal (Dallas)
|-
| colspan="6" align="center" | Chicago Force (WFA)
|-
|2011 || 8 || 0 || 0 || 1st National Central || Won National Conference Quarterfinal (Pittsburgh)Lost National Conference Semifinal (Boston)
|-
|2012 || 8 || 0 || 0 || 1st National Great Lakes || Won National Conference Quarterfinal (Indy)Won National Conference Semifinal (Jacksonville)Won National Conference Championship (Boston)Lost WFA Championship (San Diego)
|-
|2013 || 8 || 0 || 0 || 1st National Great Lakes || Won National Conference Quarterfinal (Cleveland)Won National Conference Semifinal (Atlanta)Won National Conference Championship (Boston)Won WFA Championship (Dallas)
|-
|2014 || 6 || 1 || 0 || 1st National Great Lakes || Won National Conference Quarterfinal (West Michigan)Won National Conference Semifinal (Miami)Lost National Conference Championship (Boston)
|-
|2015 || 7 || 1 || 0 || 1st National Great Lakes || Won National Conference Quarterfinal (Cleveland)Won National Conference Semifinal (Boston)Lost National Conference Championship (D.C.)
|-
|2016 || 7 || 1 || 0 || 2nd National || Lost National Conference Semifinal (Boston)
|-
|2017 || 7 || 1 || 0 || 2nd National || Won National Conference Semifinal (Pittsburgh)Lost National Conference Championship (Boston)
|-
!Totals || 123 || 16 || 0
|colspan="2"| (including playoffs)

2009

Season schedule

2010

Season schedule

2011

Standings

Season schedule

2012

Season schedule

References

 Chicago Force Football

Women's Football Alliance teams
Force
American football teams established in 2003
2003 establishments in Illinois
Women's sports in Illinois